Tinacrucis patulana is a species of moth belonging to the subfamily Tortricinae of the family Tortricidae.

Description
Tinacrucis patulana has a wingspan of about 1 centimeter. The basic color is pale brown with ashen reflections and dark brown drawings.

Behavior
This species protects their eggs building a fence around them. The moth deposits a flat circular mass of about 300 greenish eggs in about six hours. The eggs are surrounded by a circular stockade of about 3000 elongate scales, with the purpose to keep out ants or mites. These scales come from the tip of the abdomen of the moth. The caterpillars hatch after eleven days and then they escape over the stockade by spinning a ramp of silk.

Distribution and habitat
Tinacrucis patulana has been found in Mexico (Oaxaca), Costa Rica and in the jungle of Venezuela.

References

Beebe, William, 1947 Scale adaptation and utilization in Tinacrucis patulana Walker. Zoologica : 147-152
William Beebe, High Jungle Duell, Sloan and Pearce, 1949
James L. Gould,Carol Grant Gould Animal Architects: Building and the Evolution of Intelligence
Organism Names

External links
Image of T. patulana and of the erected circular stockade

Moths described in 1863
Atteriini
Moths of North America
Moths of South America